Matthieu Marchio (born 8 June, 1993) is a French politician of the National Rally and a Member of the National Assembly for Nord's 16th constituency.

Marchio was head of the Somain Let's Dare to Change list for the municipal elections in France in June 2020 and was elected as a municipal councillor. For the 2022 French legislative election, he contested Nord's 16th constituency for the National Rally and won the seat in the second round defeating French Communist Party deputy Alain Bruneel.

References 

1993 births
Living people
Deputies of the 16th National Assembly of the French Fifth Republic
National Rally (France) politicians